Ruth King may refer to:

 Ruth King (actress) (1898–1946), American film actress
 Ruth Briggs King (born 1957), American politician
 Ruth G. King (born 1933), American educational psychologist
 Ruth King (statistician), British statistician

See also
 Jerry Ruth, known as "The King", American drag racer